The CZW World Heavyweight Championship is a professional wrestling world heavyweight championship owned and promoted by the professional wrestling promotion Combat Zone Wrestling (CZW). It debuted on March 27, 1999 at CZW's The Staple Gun event.

The championship is generally contested in professional wrestling matches, often with hardcore (or "ultraviolent", as CZW generally terms it) stipulations. There have been a total of 58 reigns among 36 different wrestlers. The championship is currently vacant due to Joe Gacy signing with WWE.

History

Background
The championship was created and debuted on March 27, 1999 at CZW's The Staple Gun event, where Nick Gage defeated 20 other men in a battle royal to become the first champion. The championship has been defended and lost in countries other than the United States multiple times. The first time it changed hands on foreign soil was on April 15, 2001, when Wifebeater defeated John Zandig for the championship in Birmingham, England at a live event. Even though the CZW World Heavyweight Championship is supposed to only be eligible to "heavyweights" (wrestlers who weigh more than ), multiple lower-class wrestlers have held the championship. Wrestlers such as John Silver, Drake Younger, Nick Gage, Nick Berk, and Yoshihiro Tajiri are a few who have been storyline exceptions.

Belt design

The championship's current design involves five metal plates positioned on a leather strap. The central plate has the word "World" at the top, while the word "Champion" at the bottom. There are two light tubes that are placed at each end of the plate. The CZW logo is engraved at the very center of the plate.

Reigns

The inaugural champion was Gage, who won the championship by defeating 20 other men in a battle royal on March 27, 1999 at CZW's The Staple Gun event. Drake Younger's first reign is the longest in the title's history. John Zandig, Nick Berk, Yoshihiro Tajiri, Joe Gacy and David Starr are tied for shortest in the title's history at less than 1 day. Zandig holds the record for most reigns, with six.

Footnotes
1. - This description is based on the current design of the CZW World Heavyweight Championship, as seen in the images throughout the article.

Notes

External links
CZWrestling.com

Combat Zone Wrestling championships
World heavyweight wrestling championships